Adam Książek was a Polish professional football player, playing as a defender.

Born on 6 September 1967 in Bytom he is considered one of local club's Szombierki Bytom's legends, having remained in strong contact with the club until his death. He represented Poland in the U20s. He debuted in the top division in 1987 as a Szombierki Bytom player. On the 26 March 1988 he scored for Szombierki the 800th goal in the division. He played for Szombierki till 1990, then moving to GKS Katowice. At "Gieksa", he made 23 appearances in the top division and in 1991 he won the Polish Cup. He returned to Szombierki in 1992 and played till the end of 1993. After retirement he emigrated permanently to Germany where he lived until his sudden death in a Münster hospital on 31 December 2020.

References

External links

 - 90minut.pl profile

1967 births
2020 deaths
Polish footballers
Poland youth international footballers
Association football defenders
Sportspeople from Bytom
Szombierki Bytom players
GKS Katowice players
Polish emigrants to Germany